Bruce MacFarlane Furniss (born May 27, 1957) is an American former competition swimmer, Olympic gold medalist, and former world record-holder in four events.  At the 1976 Summer Olympics in Montreal, Quebec, he won the 200-meter freestyle and was a member of the winning U.S. team in the 4×200-meter freestyle relay, both in world record time.

Swimming career

Furniss broke ten world and nineteen American records, and won eleven Amateur Athletic Union and six NCAA titles.  He was an integral part of USC's NCAA National Collegiate Championship winning teams of 1976 and 1977.  While at USC, Furniss was coached by the legendary Peter Daland, who guided the school's men's swimming team to nine National Titles in his 35 years as the school's coach (1957 to 1992).

High school

Furniss is a 1975 graduate of Tustin, California's Foothill High School where he was coached by Tom Delong, California Interscholastic Federation's all-time winningest high school swim coach.  As a Junior at the 1974 CIF-SS Championships, Furniss broke Mark Spitz's National Interscholastic High School Record in the 200-yard Individual Medley and then in 1975 topped the record again.  Furniss-led teams won the CIF-SS Championship Title in 1972, 1973 and 1974.  Two of those years, Furniss teamed with Rod Strachan, whom Furniss would later swim with at USC and with whom was a teammate on the 1976 U.S. Olympic Men's Swim Team.  At the 1976 Olympic Games, Strachan would best Bruce's older brother, Steve, winning the Olympic gold medal in the 400-meter Individual Medley in a world record time.

1976 Olympics

Furniss was a member of the 1976 U.S. Olympic men's swimming team, which was coached by three American swimming giants, Indiana University's Doc Counsilman, Santa Clara Swim Club's George Haines, and the University of Alabama's Don Gambril, all International Swimming Hall of Fame Coaches.  The 1976 U.S. Olympic Men's Swim Team is regarded by most sports historians as the most dominating Olympic sports team ever assembled, winning 12 of 13 (92%) possible gold medals and 27 of 35 (77%) possible total medals. Furniss won Olympic gold in the 200-meter freestyle, (one of three Americans to ever win this Olympic event; Mark Spitz in 1972 and Michael Phelps in 2008 being the other two), and the 4×200-meter freestyle relay, setting world records in each event.  On July 19, 1976, the second day of the 1976 Olympic swimming program, Furniss won the 200-meter freestyle with a winning time of 1:50.29, leading an American sweep finishing ahead of fellow Americans John Naber (silver) and Jim Montgomery (bronze).  Two days later, on July 21, 1976, he teamed up with Naber, Montgomery and Mike Bruner on the 4×200-meter freestyle relay with a winning time of 7:23.22.  On that relay, Furniss, who swam the second leg, became the first person ever to break the 1:50 second barrier, splitting 1:49.56 (53.77/55.79).

World championships

Furniss also garnered two gold and two silver medals in the 1975 World Aquatics Championships in Cali, Colombia and 1978 World Aquatics Championships in West Berlin.

World records

As a 7-year-old in 1964, Furniss was inspired by the four gold medal performance of American swimmer Don Schollander, who broke the 200-meter freestyle world record ten times during his career.  Eleven years later, Furniss became the twelfth of fourteen Americans in history to break the 200-meter freestyle world record.  During his career he broke the 200-meter freestyle world record four different times, which included breaking the world record twice on the same day (June 18, 1975).  Furniss laid claim to the 200-meter freestyle world record from 1975 to 1979.

Sibling rivalry

Furniss is the third of four successful aquatic brothers, often referred to as "Orange County California's First Family of Swimming."  Older brother Steve Furniss, a two-time swimming Olympian (1972 Olympic bronze medalist and 1976 Olympic team captain), and Bruce are among a rare group of siblings, in any sport, to make the same Olympic team.   Oldest brother, Chip, a USC Collegiate Swimming All-American, finished fifth in the 1972 Olympic Swimming Trials in the 200 meter Butterfly (behind Mark Spitz and Gary Hall Sr). Youngest brother, Craig, also attended USC, where he was a two-time Collegiate All-American Water Polo Player and was USC's Valedictorian of his 1981 graduating class.

Olympic schedule changes

The decision by the International Olympic Committee to remove the 200-meter individual medley from the 1976 Summer Olympics robbed Bruce and Steve of the unique opportunity to compete against each other in an Olympic swimming event.  However, Bruce and Steve share the distinction as the only known brothers ever to have held and broken one another's world records consecutively.  In August 1975 at the United States Swimming National Championships, Bruce broke Steve's 200-meter individual medley world record in a race in which Steve also competed.  In that same meet, Bruce and Steve, swimming for Long Beach Swim Club, shared the equally unique accomplishment, (along with teammates Tim Shaw and Rex Favaro), as the last swim club team to break a swimming relay world record (4×200-meter freestyle relay).  Earlier that same summer at the 1975 World Swimming Championships team trials, Furniss also accomplished the rare feat of breaking the same world record twice in the same day (June 18, 1975) in the 200-meter freestyle.   

Notably, Furniss's dream of winning a third, and, quite possibly, a fourth Olympic Gold Medal was thwarted when the International Olympic Committee removed the 200-meter individual medley and the 4×100-meter freestyle relay (an event the United States had won in all three previous Olympics and both World Championships) from the 1976 Summer Olympics.  As the reigning 200-meter individual medley world record-holder from 1975 through 1977, Furniss was the apparent favorite for the event's 1976 Olympic gold medal.  Furniss was also United States' third fastest swimmer in the 100-meter freestyle in 1975, and was a member of the world champion and world record-holding quartet (Furniss, Andy Coan, Jim Montgomery & John Murphy) in the 4×100-meter freestyle relay, an event the Americans were favored to win in 1976 had the race been swum.  Ironically both events were permanently reinstated into the Olympic program eight years later at the 1984 Summer Olympics in Los Angeles, CA..

Long Beach Swim Club

From 1973 to the end of his career in 1980, while swimming for Long Beach Swim Club, Furniss was coached by two International Swimming Hall of Fame (ISHOF) coaches, Dick Jochums and Jon Urbanchek.  Prior to their 1973 arrival at Long Beach Swim Club, both Furniss Brothers were coached by another ISHOF inducted coach, Ralph "Flip" Darr, who also coached Gary Hall Sr. and Shirley Babashoff while at Huntington Beach Aquatic Club.

Awards and recognition

Furniss was twice named World Swimmer of the Year by Swimming World Magazine, once in 1975, and again in 1976.  In 1974 and 1975, Furniss was awarded the prestigious Robert J. H. Kiphuth Award as the country's high point winner at the United States Swimming National Championships.  He was inducted into the Orange County Sports Hall of Fame in 1984, as an "Honor Swimmer" in the ISHOF in 1987, and the University of Southern California Athletic Hall of Fame in 2001.  Furniss also participated in carrying the Olympic flame as a participant of the 1984, 1996 and 2004 Olympic Torch Relays in the Los Angeles area.

In April 2000, Furniss was selected to "USA Swimming's Swim Team of the 20th Century", an honor bestowed on only 26 U.S. male swimmers deemed to be the best of the best in the 20th century.  In January 2004, Furniss received the NCAA's Silver Anniversary Award.  The award is presented annually to six former collegiate athletes in recognition of their 25 years of post-graduate career achievements, contributions to professional organizations, and charitable and civic activities within their community.  

In February 2016, both Furniss brothers were selected to the Pac-12 Conference's All-Century Men's Swimming and Diving Team, recognizing them among the Conference's 32 best swimmers in the previous 100 years.  In 2018, Furniss was cited as one of the top 100 swimmers of all time in John Lohn's book entitled "The 100 Greatest Swimmers in History."  Both Furniss brothers were inducted into the Long Beach, CA's Aquatic Capital of America Hall of Fame in 2019.  Furniss was also one of four former collegiate athletes inducted into the CoSIDA (College Sports Information Directors of America) Academic All-American Hall of Fame Class of 2020, one of only 158 Academic All-Americans so recognized since its inception in 1988.

Personal life

Furniss graduated in 1979 from USC's Annenberg School for Communication and Journalism with a bachelor's degree in journalism. Upon his retirement from swimming in 1980, Furniss worked in sports marketing and public relations and wrote for Swimming World Magazine.  During this time he performed account work for Manning, Selvage & Lee and Burson-Marsteller, two of the world's largest public relations firms. Most of his work involved supporting the marketing efforts of several major corporate sponsors of the 1984 Olympic Games in Los Angeles, CA. Since 1985, Furniss has been self-employed as a commercial real estate broker.  He is a managing director with Berkadia in Irvine, CA, has transacted over $2.0B in multi-family real estate, and possess a core competency as an affordable housing specialist. Furniss is married and resides in Villa Park, California.  He is the father of three sons and a daughter, whom like Furniss, each attended USC.  Two of his sons played water polo for the Trojans, each playing on teams winning the NCAA Men's Water Polo Championship Title in 2012 & 2018.

Furniss is a part time Assistant Senior Coach at SoCal Aquatics in his original hometown of Tustin, CA, a swim club for which he same as a kid.  He coaches alongside Canadian Olympic Silver Medalist Stephen Pickell, with whom he swam at USC and who is the club's Head Coach .

Throughout much of his prime swimming career, Furniss became noted for achieving athletic success in spite of waging a quiet and very personal battle against the crippling arthritic disease, Ankylosing Spondylitis.

On March 29, 2020, while asleep at home, Furniss suffered a cardiac arrest. He was admitted to St. Joseph's Hospital in Orange, California, where he was treated with therapeutic hypothermia (medically induced cooling) and eventually released on April 9, 2020.

See also

 List of Olympic medalists in swimming (men)
 List of World Aquatics Championships medalists in swimming (men)
 List of University of Southern California people
 World record progression 200 metres freestyle
 World record progression 200 metres individual medley
 World record progression 4 × 100 metres freestyle relay
 World record progression 4 × 200 metres freestyle relay

References

1957 births
Living people
American male freestyle swimmers
American male medley swimmers
World record setters in swimming
Olympic gold medalists for the United States in swimming
Swimmers at the 1976 Summer Olympics
USC Trojans men's swimmers
World Aquatics Championships medalists in swimming
Medalists at the 1976 Summer Olympics
USC Annenberg School for Communication and Journalism alumni
20th-century American people